Charles Bronson (1921–2003) was an American actor.

Charles Bronson may also refer to:

Charles Bronson (prisoner), (Michael Peterson, born 1952), British criminal
 Charles Bronson (band), hardcore punk band from Illinois, USA
Charles Bronson, photographer at John F. Kennedy assassination
 Charles H. Bronson (born 1949), former Commissioner of Agriculture for Florida, US